Hulam Fen  is a Site of Special Scientific Interest in the Easington district of east County Durham, England, just south of the village of Hesleden, about 8 km north-west of Hartlepool.

Though small, the site supports a range of wetland and grassland communities in an area that is otherwise given over to arable agriculture. At the heart of the site is a hydrostatic spring that is fed by an aquifer in the underlying Magnesian Limestone and around which have developed soligenous mire, tall fen and marshy grassland.

References

Sites of Special Scientific Interest in County Durham